The canton of L'Étang-Salé is an administrative division of Réunion, an overseas department and region of France. Its borders were modified at the French canton reorganisation which came into effect in March 2015. Its seat is in L'Étang-Salé.

Composition

It consists of the following communes:
Les Avirons
L'Étang-Salé
Saint-Leu (partly)

Councillors

Pictures of the canton

References

Cantons of Réunion